Heat is the sixth studio album by Australian rock singer Jimmy Barnes. It reached number 2 on the ARIA album charts in 1993, and features the singles "Sweat It Out", "Stand Up", "Right By Your Side", and "Stone Cold", the first song written by Cold Chisel keyboardist Don Walker for Barnes since the band's demise in 1983.

Track listing
 "Sweat It Out" (Jimmy Barnes)
 "Wheels In Motion" (Jimmy Barnes, Jeff Neill, Ross Wilson)
 "Stand Up" (Jimmy Barnes, Jeff Neill, Kenny Miller)
 "Burn Baby Burn" (Jimmy Barnes, Jeff Neill, Tony Brock)
 "Something's Got a Hold" (Jimmy Barnes, Chris Bailey, Jeff Neill)
 "Love Thing" (Jimmy Barnes, Jeff Neill, Tony Brock)
 "Talking to You" (Jimmy Barnes, Jeff Neill, Tony Brock)
 "Stone Cold" (Don Walker)
 "Wait for Me" (Jimmy Barnes, Jeff Neill, Tony Brock)
 "Tears We Cry" (Jimmy Barnes)
 "Right by Your Side" (Jimmy Barnes, Jane Barnes)
 "A Little Bit of Love" (Jimmy Barnes, Tony Brock, Jerry Lynn Williams)
 "I'd Rather Be Blind" (Jimmy Barnes)
 "Not the Loving Kind" (Jimmy Barnes, Jerry Lynn Williams)
 "Knock Me Down" (Jimmy Barnes, Jeff Neill, Tony Brock)
 "Catch Your Shadow" (Jimmy Barnes, Jeff Neill, Ross Wilson, Pat Wilson)

2010 expanded edition
In 2010, Heat was re-released with an additional four tracks originally left off the album, becoming a double album. It was resequenced by Jimmy Barnes, and featured another Don Walker composition, "Sitting in A Bar", which Walker recorded with his own band, Tex, Don and Charlie. The cover was modified, removing Barnes' name and changing the colour tone to an earthy red.

2010 version track listing
Disc 1
 Sweat it Out
 Sitting In A Bar*
 Wheels in Motion
 Stand Up
 Tell Me The Truth*
 Burn Baby Burn
 Something's Got a Hold
 Rather Be With You*
 Love Thing
 Stone Cold

Disc 2
 I'd Rather be Blind
 Wait for Me
 Tears We Cry
 Talking to You
 Right by Your Side
 A Little Bit of Love
 Not the Loving Kind
 Love Will Find A Way*
 Knock Me Down
 Catch Your Shadow

Personnel

 Jimmy Barnes – vocals and guitar
 Tony Brock – drums, percussion
 Jeff Neill – guitar, vocals
 Michael Hegerty – bass
 Phil Shenale – keyboards

Chart positions

Weekly charts

Year-end charts

Sales and certifications

References

1993 albums
Jimmy Barnes albums
Albums produced by Don Gehman
Mushroom Records albums